David J. Malloy (born February 3, 1956) is an American prelate of the Roman Catholic Church who has served as the bishop of the Diocese of Rockford in Illinois since 2012.

Biography

Early life and education
David Malloy was born on February 3, 1956, in Milwaukee, Wisconsin, the son of David and Mary Malloy. He attended Christ the King Grade School in Wauwatosa, Wisconsin, then went to Wauwatosa East High School, graduating in 1974.  He received his Bachelor of Science degree in biology at Marquette Universityin Milwaukee in 1978. After completing a year of theology study at Saint Francis de Sales Seminary in Milwaukee in 1979, Malloy enrolled in the Pontifical North American College in Rome.

Ordination and ministry
Malloy was ordained a priest on July 1, 1983, by Archbishop Rembert Weakland for the Archdiocese of Milwaukee in Rome. Malloy obtained a Licentiate of Dogmatic Theology from the Pontifical Gregorian University in Rome in 1984. After returning to Wisconsin, Malloy served as the parochial vicar of Saint John Nepomuk Parish in Racine, Wisconsin, from 1984 to 1986.

Malloy went back to Rome in 1986 to attend the Pontifical Ecclesiastical Academy.  During this period, he also received a Licentiate of Canon Law from the Pontifical University of St. Thomas Aquinas and a Doctor of Theology degree from the Gregorian University. Besides English, Malloy speaks Italian, Spanish and French.

Malloy entered the diplomatic service of the Holy See in 1990, serving first as a secretary to the apostolic nuncio in Pakistan. In 1985, he was stationed at the Nunciature for several months, then went to United Nations.  Malloy left the diplomatic service in 1998 to become an official of the Prefecture of the Papal Household (1998 to 2001). On October 28, 2000, Malloy was named by the Vatican as prelate of honor.

Malloy returned to the United States as associate general secretary of the United States Conference of Catholic Bishops (USCCB) from 2001 to 2006 and then general secretary from 2006 until June 2011. At the time of his appointment as bishop, Malloy was serving as pastor of Saint Francis de Sales Parish in Lake Geneva, Wisconsin.

Bishop of Rockford
On March 20, 2012, Pope Benedict XVI appointed Malloy as bishop of the Diocese of Rockford.  He was consecrated on May 14, 2012, by Cardinal Francis George. Bishop Thomas Doran, and Archbishop Jerome Listecki served as co-consecrators. Upon his appointment as bishop, Malloy joined Bishop Robert Lynch and Archbishop Dennis Schnurr as former USCCB general secretaries named bishops in the United States.

In January 2017, Malloy sent a letter to the priests of his diocese stating: "In order to underscore our unity in prayer and to avoid differences between and even within parishes on this point, I ask that no Masses be celebrated ad orientem [facing the altar] without my permission." Ad orientem was allowed by the General Instruction of the Roman Missal and had been recommended by Cardinal Robert Sarah of the Congregation for Divine Worship and the Discipline of the Sacraments. Sarah met privately with Pope Francis and on July 11, 2017, the Holy See Press Office issued a statement that said that Sarah's London remarks had been "incorrectly interpreted, as if they were intended to announce new indications different to those given so far in the liturgical rules and in the words of the Pope regarding celebration facing the people and the ordinary rite of the Mass", that celebrating mass facing the congregation (versus populum) was "desirable wherever possible" and not to be superseded by ad orientem. It reported that the Pope and Sarah agreed on these points.

Malloy added: "Second, for similar reasons, in keeping with Art. 5 §1 of Summorum Pontificum, and with due regard to Art. 2 of that same document, Masses are not to be celebrated using the Extraordinary Form without my permission." Art. 5 §1 of the papal document cited says: "In parishes where a group of the faithful attached to the previous liturgical tradition stably exists, the parish priest should willingly accede to their requests to celebrate Holy Mass according to the rite of the 1962 Roman Missal. He should ensure that the good of these members of the faithful is harmonized with the ordinary pastoral care of the parish, under the governance of the bishop in accordance with Canon 392, avoiding discord and favouring the unity of the whole Church." Article 2, to which Malloy said due regard was to be given, concerns Masses said without a congregation: "In Masses celebrated without a congregation, any Catholic priest of the Latin rite, whether secular or regular, may use either the Roman Missal published in 1962 by Blessed Pope John XXIII or the Roman Missal promulgated in 1970 by Pope Paul VI, and may do so on any day, with the exception of the Easter Triduum. For such a celebration with either Missal, the priest needs no permission from the Apostolic See or from his own Ordinary."On November 15, 2018, Malloy released a list of clerics from the diocese who had been accused of acts of sexual abuse from 1925 to 1991.  In March 2019, Malloy revoked the priestly faculties of Joseph Jablonski, a priest of the Missionaries of the Sacred Heart.  While ministering in the Diocese of San Bernardino in California in 2014, Jablonski allegedly made remarks to a young boy that constituted sexual grooming.  The Diocese of San Bernardino immediately reported him to authorities and banned him from ministering in its parishes.  When Jablonski moved to the Archdiocese of Chicago, the Missionaries did not notify the archdiocese about his record in California.

See also

 Catholic Church hierarchy
 Catholic Church in the United States
 Historical list of the Catholic bishops of the United States
 List of Catholic bishops of the United States
 Lists of patriarchs, archbishops, and bishops

References

External links 

Roman Catholic Diocese of Rockford

Episcopal succession

Living people
1951 births
Religious leaders from Milwaukee
People from Rockford, Illinois
Diplomats of the Holy See
Pontifical North American College alumni
Pontifical Gregorian University alumni
Pontifical University of Saint Thomas Aquinas alumni
Pontifical Ecclesiastical Academy alumni
Marquette University alumni
21st-century Roman Catholic bishops in the United States
Roman Catholic bishops of Rockford
Roman Catholic Archdiocese of Milwaukee